The 2017–18 Continental Cup was the 21st edition of the IIHF Continental Cup, Europe's second-tier ice hockey club competition organised by International Ice Hockey Federation. The season started on 29 September 2017 and the final tournament was played on 12–14 January 2018.

Qualified teams

First round

Group A
The Group A tournament was played in Belgrade, Serbia, from 29 September to 1 October 2017 with all games were held at the Pionir Ice Hall.

All times are local. (CEST – UTC+2)

Second round

Group B
The Group B tournament was played in Riga, Latvia, from 20 to 22 October 2017 with all games were held at the Kurbads Ledus Halle.

All times are local. (EEST – UTC+3)

Group C
The Group C tournament was played in Brașov, Romania, from 20 to 22 October 2017 with all games were held at the Brașov Olympic Ice Rink.

All times are local. (EEST – UTC+3)

Third round

Group D
The Group D tournament was played in Rungsted, Denmark, from 17 to 19 November 2017 with all games were held at the Saxo Bank Arena.

All times are local. (CET – UTC+1)

Group E
The Group E tournament was played in Ritten, Italy, from 17 to 19 November 2017 with all games were held at the Arena Ritten.

All times are local. (CET – UTC+1)

Final round
Continental Cup Final tournament was played in Minsk, Belarus, from 12 to 14 January 2018 with all games were held at the Čyžoŭka-Arena.

All times are local. (FET – UTC+3)

See also

 2017–18 Champions Hockey League

References

External links
 Official IIHF tournament page

IIHF Continental Cup
2017–18 in European ice hockey